The Daly languages are an areal group of four to five language families of Indigenous Australian languages. They are spoken within the vicinity of the Daly River in the Northern Territory.

Classification 
In the lexicostatistic classification of O'Grady, Voegelin and Voegelin, the Daly languages were put in four distinct families. Darrell Tryon combined these into a single family, with the exception of Murrinh-patha. However, such methodologies are less effective with languages with a long history of word borrowing.

Ian Green found that the languages could not be shown to be related by the comparative method, and so should be considered five independent families and language isolates. The features they do share also tend to be shared with neighboring languages outside the Daly group.

The established families (according to Nordlinger) are:
Wagaydyic (Anson Bay)
Batjamalh (Wadjiginy)
Pungu Pungu (Kandjerramalh)
Malak-Malak (Nguluk Wanggar)
Western Daly 
Marri Ngarr
Merranunggu
Marrithiyel
Marramaninjsji
Eastern Daly 
Matngele (Werret/Dakayu)
Kamu
Southern Daly
Murrinh-patha  
Ngan’gityemerri

Malak-Malak and Wagaydyic were once considered grouped into a Northern Daly family. Contemporary classifications may use Northern Daly to refer to Malak-Malak to the exclusion of the Wagaydyic languages (as Nordlinger does).

Vocabulary
Capell (1940) lists the following basic vocabulary items for three Daly languages:

{| class="wikitable sortable"
! gloss
! Mulluk Mulluk(Northern Daly) !! Marithiel(Western Daly) !! Nanggumiri(Southern Daly)
|-
! man
|  ||  || 
|-
! woman
|  ||  || 
|-
! head
|  ||  || 
|-
! eye
|  ||  || 
|-
! nose
|  ||  || 
|-
! mouth
|  ||  || 
|-
! tongue
|  ||  || 
|-
! stomach
|  ||  || 
|-
! bone
|  ||  || 
|-
! blood
|  ||  || 
|-
! kangaroo
|  ||  || 
|-
! opossum
|  ||  || 
|-
! emu
|  ||  || 
|-
! crow
|  ||  || 
|-
! fly
|  ||  || 
|-
! sun
|  ||  || 
|-
! moon
|  ||  || 
|-
! fire
|  ||  || 
|-
! smoke
|  ||  || 
|-
! water
|  ||  || 
|}

References

External links
 The Daly Languages website (dalylanguages.org) brings together analysis, field note sketches and recordings of these languages.

 
Proposed language families
Non-Pama-Nyungan languages